Daro is a union administration of tehsil Mirpur Bathoro, a small thick-populated town situated on the left bank of Pinjari Canal of Ghulam Muhammad (Kotri) Barrage about 10 km to the East of Mirpur Bathoro, Sujawal District, Sindh, Pakistan.

Daro's education system consists of two primary schools called Government Primary School Daro. Additionally, it has two segregated higher secondary schools, namely Government Boys Higher Secondary School Daro and Government Girls Higher Secondary School Daro.

References 

Populated places in Sindh
Mirpur District